Wild Hearts is an action role-playing video game developed by Omega Force and published by Electronic Arts under its EA Originals label. The game tasks the player to hunt massive monsters in Azuma, a fantasy world inspired by feudal Japan. The game was released on February 17, 2023, for PlayStation 5, Windows, and Xbox Series X/S.

Gameplay
Players assume the role of a nameless hunter, who must embark on quests to hunt down massive monsters known as Kemono in the world of Azuma. Azuma is not an open world, but instead, several large areas that players can freely explore. The game features eight different weapon types, including the likes of wagasa and katana. In addition to using weapons to defeat enemies, players can also build items to assist combat through the Karakuri mechanic. For instance, players can build crates which can be leapt off of to perform powerful attacks, or a torch which can be used to ignite enemies. These items can be combined to form larger machines, such as a bulwark that blocks an enemy's path. Constructed items are permanent until they are destroyed by Kemono. Players can also build Karakuri to aid transversal. Building Karakuri consumes thread, which can be acquired through simply attacking enemies. As the player progresses in the game, they will unlock new weapons and armors, allowing players to hunt more challenging monsters. The team estimated that players can complete the game's narrative campaign in about 30 hours. Players can team up with two other players as they progress in the game.

Development
The game was developed by Japanese developer Omega Force. Development of the game started in 2018. According to game director Kotaro Hirata, the team learned from their experience developing the Toukiden series, and intended to create a modern Japanese monster-hunting game. To stand out from other monster hunting games, the team introduced Kemono, monsters which were described as "a fusion of nature and animals", and Karakuri, a building mechanic which supplements the game's melee combat. Monsters and creatures were designed to be threatening and challenging, so that players would not feel "guilty" about killing them. The team did not make Wild Hearts an installment in the Toukiden series because they felt that the game had its own distinct presentation and combat mechanics. The game world was inspired by feudal Japan, and it features four different biomes, each based on one of the four seasons. Originally the game supported four-player multiplayer; this was later altered as the team believed that it would create imbalanced gameplay.

Hirata, mentioned in an Interview with The Verge, that Dynasty Warriors had become a pillar franchise for Omega Force, and that with Wild Hearts, they hoped to have another strong pillar franchise.

Publisher Electronic Arts announced its partnership with Omega Force and its parent company Koei Tecmo on September 14, 2022. The game would be published under its EA Originals label, which had previously released smaller, independent video games such as It Takes Two and Unravel. The game was officially announced on September 23, 2022. Wild Hearts was released for PlayStation 5, Windows, and Xbox Series X/S on February 17, 2023, with support for cross-platform play.

Reception

Critical reception

Wild Hearts received "generally favorable" reviews, according to review aggregator Metacritic.

Rock Paper Shotgun enjoyed the title's building mechanics, saying it made the player feel "less of a mythical superhero and more of a desperate inventor", but criticized how poor performance was on Windows. Eurogamer praised the game's feudal Japan-inspired world, "it's beautiful stuff – and even more impressive once rampaging Kemono start smashing it to bits". The Verge liked the music and the scope of the fights, writing "The sweeping orchestral score and the sheer size and power of the monsters make even the one-star hunts feel like an epic battle". NPR praised the game's monster appearance and power design, saying "stunning and enormous animals superpowered by primal nature".

Sales

The PlayStation 5 version of Wild Hearts was the second bestselling retail game during its first week of release in Japan, with 26,905 physical copies being sold across the country.

References

External links
 

2023 video games
Action role-playing video games
Cancelled Stadia games
Windows games
PlayStation 5 games
Xbox Series X and Series S games
Electronic Arts games
Video games developed in Japan
Hunting in video games
Multiplayer and single-player video games
Omega Force games